Østervrå (formerly Øster Vrå) is a town in Vendsyssel, North Jutland Region, Denmark. As of 2022, the town has a population of 1,287. The town and farm areas around the town was hit by an F2 tornado on september 9, 1924. Significant damage, including a collapsed barn. 5 people sustained injuries.

Notable people 

 Poul Kjærholm (1929 in Østervrå – 1980) a Danish industrial designer
 Ole Scherfig, (Danish Wiki) (1930 in Østervrå - 2000) business manager
 Joakim Mæhle (born 1997 in Østervrå) a Danish footballer at Serie A club Atalanta and the Danish National Team.

References 

Cities and towns in the North Jutland Region
Frederikshavn Municipality
Vendsyssel